Kamma Township is a township in Thayet District of Magway Region. The administrative seat of the township is Kamma. As of 2014, there are 75,195 residents in the township.

Economy
Agriculture in legume, peanuts, rice and sesame are the main economic activities in the township.

References

Townships of Magway Region